Acasis viretata, the yellow-barred brindle, is a moth of the family Geometridae. The species was first described by Jacob Hübner in 1799. It is found from most of Europe and across the Palearctic to Korea. In northern India it is represented by Acacis viretata himalayica (Prout, 1958). It is also present in North America. It occurs in many different habitats, including deciduous and mixed forests, rocky slopes and valleys, as well as bushy meadows, bogs and taiga areas. In the Alps it can still be found at an altitude of 1700 meters

The wingspan is 25–29 mm. The base colour of the forewing is olive green, but soon fades to yellowish. There is a black and green cross band running across the forewing.The wavy cross lines are blackish, dotted with black, and sometimes there are whitish lines between them. Not infrequently the basal area is also blackish marked. The hindwing is white.

The caterpillar is green, more or less tinged with pinkish; three interrupted pink lines on the back, the central one sometimes inclining to purple, and broken up into large wine-red to red heart-shaped spots; the head is brown, sometimes marked with purplish, and there are two tiny points on the last segment. It varies in the green tint and also in marking.

Adults are on wing from mid-April to October in two generations in western Europe.

The larvae feed on a wide variety of plants, including Rhamnus frangula, Hedera helix, Ligustrum, Ilex aquifolium, Cornus sanguinea and Sorbus aucuparia.

Similar species
Acasis appensata

External links

Yellow-barred brindle at UKMoths
Fauna Europaea
Lepiforum e.V.

Trichopterygini
Moths described in 1799
Moths of Asia
Moths of Europe
Moths of North America
Taxa named by Jacob Hübner